The prime minister of the Cabinet (Naegak Chongri Daeshin) of Korea during the Joseon dynasty was the non-executive head of government of the Korean Empire. The prime minister was appointed by the emperor of Korea had to enjoy the confidence of the parliament to remain in office. He was the head of the Cabinet and led the various administrative branches and supervision and appointment rights in the name of the monarch of the other ministers of state. The literal translation of the Korean name for the office is Prime Minister of the Cabinet of the Korean Empire.

History 
Prior to the adoption of the modern constitution, Korea had in practice no written constitution. Originally, a Chinese-inspired legal system was enacted. It described a government based on an elaborate and rational meritocratic bureaucracy, serving, in theory, under the ultimate authority of the monarch. Under this system, the yeonguijeong, or chief state councillor, was the head of the State Council, the highest organ of Korea's pre-modern royal government during the Joseon era and until briefly under the Korean Empire. The office was replaced with the appointment of Kim Hong-jip (previously the last Yeonguijeong) to the new position of Prime Minister in 1895 with the Gabo Reform.

With the annexation of Korea to the Empire of Japan the office came to an end. 

During the Provisional Government of the Republic of Korea in Exile in Shanghai, China, a prime minister position was recreated for a brief few days for Syngman Rhee to replace the chairman of the Provisional Legislative Assembly. The role was changed over to Chief Executive in 1919, changed again as Premier 1919-1926 and finally as President from 1926–1948.

The current divided Korea has two respective prime ministers on both sides, which are the prime minister of North Korea and the prime minister of South Korea.

Lists of prime ministers of Korea
 List of prime ministers of Korea

 

ja:内閣総理大臣 (大韓帝国)
ko:대한제국의 내각총리대신
zh:大韩帝国内阁总理大臣列表